The Indian cricket team toured South Africa for four Tests and seven ODIs from 29 October 1992 to 6 January 1993. 

South Africa won the Test series 1-0. 

South Africa won the ODI series 5–2.

Test matches

1st Test

2nd Test

3rd Test

4th Test

ODI series

1st ODI

2nd ODI

3rd ODI

4th ODI

5th ODI

6th ODI

7th ODI

References

External links
 Cricarchive
 Tour page CricInfo
 Record CricInfo

1992 in South African cricket
1993 in South African cricket
South African cricket seasons from 1970–71 to 1999–2000
1992-93
International cricket competitions from 1991–92 to 1994
1992 in Indian cricket
1993 in Indian cricket